Gold digger is a term for a person, typically a woman,  who engages in a type of transactional relationship for money rather than love. If it turns into marriage, it is a type of marriage of convenience.

Etymology and usage 

The term "gold digger" is a slang term that has its roots among chorus girls and sex workers in the early 20th century. In print, the term can be found in Rex Beach's 1911 book, The Ne'er-Do-Well, and in the 1915 memoir My Battles with Vice by Virginia Brooks. The Oxford Dictionary and Random House's Dictionary of Historical Slang state the term is distinct for women because they were much more likely to need to marry a wealthy man in order to achieve or maintain a level of socioeconomic status.

The term rose in usage after the popularity of Avery Hopwood's play The Gold Diggers in 1919. Hopwood first heard the term in a conversation with Ziegfeld performer Kay Laurell.

As an indication on how new the slang term was, Broadway producers urged him to change the title because they feared that the audience would think that the play was about mining and the Gold Rush.

Society and culture

General
There exist several cases where female public figures have been perceived as exemplars of the gold digger stereotype by the public. The best-known gold digger of the early 20th century was Peggy Hopkins Joyce. Joyce was a former show girl who married and divorced millionaires. She was characterized as a gold digger during her divorce battle with Stanley Joyce during the early 1920s. Some have argued that she was the real-life inspiration for Lorelei Lee, the protagonist in Anita Loos’ 1925 novel Gentlemen Prefer Blondes which holds gold digging as a central theme. Additionally, some have contended that the term "gold digger" was coined to describe her.  Former Olympian Eleanor Holm was dubbed the "swimming gold digger" for her divorce contest with Broadway impresario Billy Rose during the 1950s. The press and public described model and actress, Anna Nicole Smith, as a gold digger for marrying multi-millionaire octogenarian J. Howard Marshall II. There was even a book published as a Little Blue Book  (Little Blue Book No. 1392, Confessions of a Gold Digger, by Betty Van Deventer, 1929).

Law 
The recurring image of the gold digger in Western popular media throughout the 1920s and 1930s developed into an important symbol of a moral panic surrounding frivolous lawsuits. Sharon Thompson's research has demonstrated how public perception of the prevalence of gold digging has created disadvantages for female spouses without their own source of income in the negotiation of alimony cases and prenuptial agreements. The gold digger stereotype triggered public discussions about heartbalm legislation during the 1930s, particularly breach of promise cases. Public outrage surrounding the image of frivolous lawsuits and unfair alimony payouts related to the gold digger archetype contributed to a nationwide push throughout the middle and late 1930s to outlaw heart balm legislation in the United States.

Popular culture

Film
The gold digger emerged as a dominant trope in American popular culture beginning in the 1920s. Stephen Sharot stated that the gold digger supplanted the popularity of the vamp in 1920s cinema.

By the 1930s, the term "gold digger" had reached the United Kingdom through a British remake of The Gold Diggers. While the film received negative critical reception, several sequels with the same title have been produced.

In the 1930s, the gold digger trope was used in a number of popular American films, most notably Gold Diggers of 1933, Gold Diggers of 1935, Baby Face, Red-Headed Woman, Dinner at Eight, and Havana Widows. Film historian Roger Dooley notes that the gold digger is one of the most common of the “stock company of stereotypes that continually reappear in the films of the 1930s.” Gold diggers in 1930s cinema were often portrayed in positive, sometimes heroic, ways. The character has featured in many films since the 1930s such as Gentlemen Prefer Blondes (1953) and How to Marry a Millionaire  (1953), both starring Marilyn Monroe, or as a villainous foil, as in both versions of Disney's film The Parent Trap.

Music

The gold digger image or trope appears in several popular songs, including "My Heart Belongs to Daddy" (1938), "Diamonds Are a Girl’s Best Friend" (1949), "Santa Baby" (1953), "She Got the Goldmine (I Got The Shaft)" (1982), and "Material Girl" (1984). Rap music's use of the "gold digger script" is one of a few prevalent sexual scripts that is directed at young African-American women. For example Kanye West's "Gold Digger" and EPMD's "Gold Digger" both reference a woman marrying for perceived wealth. West's "Gold Digger" brought attention to the Gold Digger trope into Pop Culture, especially because of the music video that followed.

See also
 Age disparity in sexual relationships
 Hypergamy
 Mistress (lover)
 Prostitution
 Separate property systems
 Sugar baby
 Social stigma
 Transactional sex
 Treating (dating)
 Trophy wife

References

1910s neologisms
Social status
Stereotypes of women
Pejorative terms for women
Slang terms for women